Harrison L. Rhodes (born July 15, 1993) is an American professional stock car racing driver. He last competed part-time in the NASCAR Xfinity Series, driving the No. 52 Chevrolet Camaro for Jimmy Means Racing.

Racing career
A native of High Point, North Carolina, Rhodes started racing at age 10 in midget cars. He moved up to Legends cars at the end of 2007, battling for the 2009 national championship; he wound up finishing second.

After competing in NASCAR local competition and the UARA Late Model Series in 2011, Rhodes moved up in 2012 to the NASCAR K&N Pro Series East; after racing in two events for Spraker Racing, he moved to MacDonald Motorsports, racing in three of the final seven races of the season. He posted his best finish in the series, fourth, in his first race of the year at Bowman-Gray Stadium. Rhodes also drove in four Pro Cup Series races during the year, posting a best finish of fifth at Anderson Motor Speedway.

For 2013, Rhodes moved up to the Nationwide Series, making his series debut at Phoenix International Raceway driving for Rick Ware Racing in association with R3 Motorsports in the No. 23 Ford.

In 2014, Rhodes moved to SR² Motorsports, driving the No. 24 Toyota in selected races starting at Daytona International Speedway.

For 2015, JD Motorsports announced that Rhodes would be their third full-time driver with the No. 0 Chevrolet Camaro. He failed to qualify for the season opener, missed 4 races and drive two for MBM Motorsports. He had a best finish of 9th at the July Daytona race. On January 28, 2016, it was announced Rhodes will drive the No. 97 Chevrolet Camaro for Obaika Racing full-time, replacing various drivers. Rhodes was replaced by Ryan Ellis for the spring Texas race.

On February 7, 2017, JD Motorsports announced that Rhodes would return to the team for the full 2017 season, driving the No. 01 car. However, Sheldon Creed replaced Rhodes in the No. 01 at Mid-Ohio Sports Car Course. Vinnie Miller replaced Rhodes full-time in the No. 01 for the 2018 season.

In February 2018, Rhodes joined Rick Ware Racing to make his Cup Series debut in the Folds of Honor QuikTrip 500 at Atlanta Motor Speedway, driving the No. 51 Camaro ZL1.

Personal life
Rhodes attended NC State where he graduated in 2016.

Motorsports career results

NASCAR
(key) (Bold – Pole position awarded by qualifying time. Italics – Pole position earned by points standings or practice time. * – Most laps led.)

Monster Energy Cup Series

Xfinity Series

K&N Pro Series East

 Season still in progress
 Ineligible for series points
 Rhodes began the 2013 season not eligible for Nationwide Series points, but began receiving points starting at Dover in July.

References

External links
 
 

Living people
1993 births
Sportspeople from High Point, North Carolina
Racing drivers from North Carolina
NASCAR drivers
CARS Tour drivers
High Point University alumni